The  was an army of the Imperial Japanese Army during the final days of World War II.

History
The Japanese 56th Army was formed on April 21, 1945, under the Japanese 16th Area Army as part of the last desperate defense effort by the Empire of Japan to deter possible landings of Allied forces in northern Kyūshū during Operation Downfall.  The Japanese 56th Army was based in Iizuka city, Fukuoka Prefecture. It consisted mostly of poorly trained reservists, conscripted students and Volunteer Fighting Corps home guard militia. It was demobilized at the surrender of Japan on August 15, 1945, without having seen combat.

List of Commanders

References

External links

56
Military units and formations established in 1945
Military units and formations disestablished in 1945